The 2010 Italian Figure Skating Championships was held in Brescia from December 17 through 20, 2009. Skaters competed in the disciplines of men's singles, ladies' singles, pair skating, ice dancing, and synchronized skating on the levels of senior, junior, and novice. The results were used to choose the teams to the 2010 World Championships, the 2010 European Championships, and the 2010 World Junior Championships.

Senior results

Men

Ladies

Pairs

Ice dancing

Synchronized

Junior results

Men

Ladies A

 WD = Withdrawn

Ladies B

 WD = Withdrawn

Ice dancing

Synchronized

Novice results

Synchronized

External links
 
 2010 Italian Figure Skating Championships
 2010 Italian Figure Skating Championships results

Italian Figure Skating Championships
2009 in figure skating
Italian Figure Skating Championships, 2010
2010 in Italian sport